is a Japanese football player for Avispa Fukuoka.

Career
After being a protagonist at Waseda University football team, Kumamoto joined Montedio Yamagata for 2018 season, becoming an immediate starter under manager Takashi Kiyama.

In December 2021, it was announced Kumamoto would be joining Avispa Fukuoka after spending four seasons at Montedio Yamagata.

Club statistics
.

References

External links

Profile at J. League
Profile at Avispa Fukuoka

1995 births
Living people
Association football people from Fukuoka Prefecture
People from Tagawa, Fukuoka
Japanese footballers
J2 League players
Montedio Yamagata players
Avispa Fukuoka players
Association football defenders